Qaranjik-e Pur Aman (also Romanized as Qaranjīk-e Pūr Amān; also known as Qaranjīk-e Lūrāmān) is a village in Mazraeh-ye Jonubi Rural District, Voshmgir District, Aqqala County, Golestan Province, Iran. At the 2006 census, its population was 1,065, in 197 families.

References 

Populated places in Aqqala County